Sokol and Sokol-2 were Soviet 35 mm photo camera brands. In 1966–1986, more than 400,000 were produced by LOMO. Some were exported to Europe. The price of the camera in 1977 was 145 rubles, almost one and a half times more expensive than the mirror "Zenith-E" with interchangeable optics. For Soviet photographers, Sokol proved to be too expensive, and for professional photography it was unsuitable. In 1978, the production of the camera was discontinued, a total of 226,600 copies that came off the assembly line, as well as 1,000 cameras called "LOMO-130A".

Technical parameters 
Type: Rangefinder camera
Lens: Industar-70, non-removable
Shutter: Central
Film: 35 mm, 36 frames

History 
"Sokol" means "falcon" in Russian, hence the name was probably intended to bring associations with the "eye of a falcon" - the saying for excellent vision.

References

External links 
Sokol-2 on Alfred's Camera page 
Sokol-2 on the Sovietcams.com

Rangefinder cameras